Griže is a small settlement in the Municipality of Ivančna Gorica in central Slovenia. It lies on the regional road from Ivančna Gorica to Šentvid pri Stični in the historical region of Lower Carniola. The municipality is now included in the Central Slovenia Statistical Region. It includes the hamlet of Vrh.

References

External links
Griže on Geopedia

Populated places in the Municipality of Ivančna Gorica